Phillip Adams, Philip Adams, or Phil Adams may refer to:

Sports
Phillip Adams (American football) (1988–2021), American football cornerback
Phillip Adams (sport shooter) (born 1945), Australian pistol shooter
Phil Adams (cricketer) (born 1991), Australian cricketer
Philippe Adams (born 1969), Belgian racing driver

Others
Phillip Adams (writer) (born 1939), Australian media personality
Sir Philip Adams (1915–2001), British diplomat
Philip Francis Adams (1828–1901), Surveyor General of New South Wales, Australia